Jentleson is a surname. Notable people with the surname include:

 Adam Jentleson, former speechwriter for John Kerry, son of Bruce
 Bruce Jentleson (born 1951), Clinton administration foreign policy advisor and political science professor